Ksement Mehmeti (born 31 October 1998) is an Albanian professional footballer who plays as a midfielder for Albanian club Apolonia.

References

1998 births
Living people
Association football midfielders
Albanian footballers
Albania youth international footballers
KF Apolonia Fier players
Kategoria e Parë players